Amastra porcus was a species of air-breathing land snail, a terrestrial pulmonate gastropod mollusk in the family Amastridae. This species was endemic to Hawaii.

References

Amastra
Extinct gastropods
Taxonomy articles created by Polbot